Prabhat Raju Koli (born 27 July 1999) is an Indian open water swimmer based in Mumbai. In 2018, Koli was awarded with the Tenzing Norgay National Adventure Award, which was presented by Ramnath Kovind, the President of India. He was also awarded with Shiv Chhatrapati Award by the Maharashtra government.

Swimming 
In 2016, Koli participated in the  India National Open Water Swimming Competition in West Bengal.

Honours 
Koli has won awards for being:

 The youngest swimmer of the Triple Crown of Open Water.
 The first Asian swimmer to swim from Germany to Switzerland.
 The youngest swimmer to swim from Llandudno to Camps Bay in South Africa.
 First Asian swimmer to swim from Jersey to France.
 The first swimmer to swim along the Cape Town coast in South Africa.
 The first Asian swimmer to swim in the mainland in Anacapa.

See also 
 List of Koli people
 List of Koli states and clans

References

External links 

 Prabhat Koli on Twitter
Prabhat Koli Official Website

1999 births
Living people
Indian male swimmers
20th-century Indian people
21st-century Indian people